Peter O'Brien was a Gaelic football goalkeeper from Killarney, County Kerry, Ireland. He played with the Dr. Crokes club and the Kerry intercounty team. 

He played with the Kerry senior team for one season in 1995. 

After playing underage football, at a senior club level, O'Brien won Kerry Senior Football Championship titles in 1991 and 2000. The 1991 title was the first win since 1914 for Dr. Crokes. O'Brien also won two Munster Senior Club Football Championship titles in 1990 and 1991 and an All-Ireland Senior Club Football Championship in 1992. He now has 3 kids Ross,Lauren,Keelan.

He is credited with giving Colm Cooper his nickname, The Gooch.

References
 http://munster.gaa.ie/history/sfclub_teams/
 http://www.terracetalk.com/kerry-football/player/131/Peter-OBrien
 http://www.drcrokes.com/

Year of birth missing (living people)
Living people
Dr Crokes Gaelic footballers
Gaelic football goalkeepers
Kerry inter-county Gaelic footballers